Why Pick on Me? is a 1918 short comedy film starring Harold Lloyd.

Cast
 Harold Lloyd
 Snub Pollard 
 Bebe Daniels
 William Blaisdell
 Sammy Brooks
 Harry Burns
 William Gillespie
 Helen Gilmore
 Lew Harvey
 Bud Jamison
 James Parrott

See also
 Harold Lloyd filmography

References

External links

1918 films
American black-and-white films
1918 comedy films
1918 short films
American silent short films
Silent American comedy films
American comedy short films
1910s American films